The club (AS SONIDEP) was founded in 2014 by the Nigerien Petroleum Products Company (SONIDEP) and is based in Niamey, Niger. It is the most recent Nigerien football club.

In the first division since the first year of its creation, the tanker club won the National Cup in 2014-2015 and was the champion of the second division. In performance during this season, the club had the best defense of the championship with 1 goal conceded. Also in this competition for the national cup, AS SONIDEP was a finalist in the match against FC Sahel. During the 2017-2018 season, AS SONIDEP was eliminated in the quarter-final of the national cup. As part of the 1st Division National Championship, the club was ranked 8th in the 2016-17 season. While in the 2017-2018 season, AS SONIDEP reached the top of Niger by winning the Airtel League 1 National Championship, the most prestigious competition in the country, after only 4 years of existence. 

Internationally, the club participated in the CAF Confederation Cup of the 2015-2016 season following its success in the national cup. AS SONIDEP represents Niger in the African Champions League.

Achievements
Niger Premier League: 2
 2018, 2019.

Niger Cup: 2
 2015, 2019.

Niger Super Cup: 1
 2018.

Performance in CAF competitions
CAF Champions League: 3 appearances
2019 – Preliminary Round
2020 – Preliminary Round
2021 – First Round

CAF Confederation Cup: 2 appearances
2016 – Preliminary Round
2021 – Play-off Round

Current squad

References

Football clubs in Niger
Super Ligue (Niger) clubs